Jorge Alberto Arreaza Montserrat (Venezuelan ; born 6 June 1973) is a Venezuelan politician who has held several important positions in the administration of President Hugo Chávez and his successor Nicolás Maduro. From August 2017 to August 2021, Arreaza served as Venezuela's Minister of Foreign Affairs.

Education and early career
Born in Caracas, Arreaza Montserrat received a degree in international studies from the Central University of Venezuela (UCV) and was awarded a scholarship by the Gran Mariscal de Ayacucho Foundation during the 1990s, which allowed him to earn a master's degree in European Policy Studies at University of Cambridge, England. At UCV, he also worked as a journalist and university teacher, in addition to working as an announcer and interviewer on several public television venues in Venezuela, and as host of the television show Diálogo abierto on Venezolana de Televisión.

Political career

Arreaza Montserrat was appointed the vice president of Venezuela and served from 2013 to 2016.  He previously served as Minister of Science and Technology from 2011 to 2013 and also served as President of Fundación Gran Mariscal de Ayacucho (FUNDAYACUCHO) from 2005 until December 2009. He became Chavez's son-in-law in 2007, after marrying Chavez's eldest daughter, Rosa Virginia. Throughout the final stages of Chavez's illness, Arreaza served as unofficial spokesman of the Chavez family.

Arreaza has dismissed the opposition criticisms that the government is using the army to promote an ideology, which is against the 1999 constitution, saying "the military are Chávez-militants who will guarantee the socialist model in Venezuela".

On 2 August 2017, after the election of the National Constituent Assembly, President Nicolás Maduro appointed Arreaza as head of the Venezuelan Foreign Ministry, with the mission of retaking the leading role of Venezuela in the world. Arreaza was succeeded as Foreign Minister by Felix Plasencia in August 2021.

Sanctions

Canada
On 15 April 2019, Canada announced that sanctions on 43 individuals were applied on 12 April based on the Special Economic Measures Act. The government statement said "the sanctions hit high ranking officials of the Maduro regime, regional governors, and people directly implicated in activities undermining democratic institutions". Foreign Minister Chrystia Freeland stated, "The Maduro dictatorship must be held accountable for this crisis and depriving Venezuelans of their most basic rights and needs. Canada is committed to supporting the peaceful restoration of constitutional democracy in Venezuela."  

The newly sanctioned Venezuelans included Arreaza. In response, his ministry has accused Canada of supporting Trump's "war adventure" and said that Prime Minister Justin Trudeau "has invalidated Canada as a reliable actor in dialogue."

United States
The United States sanctioned Arreaza along with Judge Carol Bealexis Padilla de Arretureta on 26 April 2019 as they were determined to be current or former officials of the Government of Venezuela. Both were accused of exploiting the U.S. financial system to support the “illegitimate” regime of Nicolas Maduro. The U.S. Department of State issued a statement describing Arreaza as being "at the forefront" of the Maduro administration attempts "to thwart the democratic aspirations of the Venezuelan people."

Hours later, Arreaza responded that the sanctions "gives us more strength for the struggle." He further elaborated saying that "Yesterday, we denounced the US criminal blockade against Venezuela at the UN. Today, the Trump administration responds with desperation against us. TRUTH hurts!"

According to US ambassador to the OAS Carlos Trujillo, Arreaza could face financial difficulties when trying to make transactions with the Maduro government through the US financial system, as well as visa difficulties due to the sanctions.

See also
List of Ministers of Foreign Affairs of Venezuela
List of current foreign ministers
List of foreign ministers in 2017, 2018, 2019, 2020 and 2021

References

Twitter
Twitter - Jorge Arreaza M (@jaarreaza)

|-

|- 

|-

1973 births
Living people
Vice presidents of Venezuela
Central University of Venezuela alumni
Government ministers of Venezuela
People of the Crisis in Venezuela
Politicians from Caracas
Venezuelan Ministers of Foreign Affairs
Alumni of the University of Cambridge
United Socialist Party of Venezuela politicians
Venezuelan Ministers of Science
Venezuelan Ministers of Technology